São Miguel dos Milagres is a municipality located in the northern coast of the Brazilian state of Alagoas. Its population was 8,013 (2020) and its area is 65 km².

References

Populated coastal places in Alagoas
Municipalities in Alagoas